The 2019 AFC U-19 Women's Championship was the 10th edition of the AFC U-19 Women's Championship, the biennial international youth football championship organised by the Asian Football Confederation (AFC) for the women's under-19 national teams of Asia. The tournament was held in Thailand between 27 October and 9 November 2019, with a total of eight teams competing.

The top three teams of the tournament would have qualified for the 2021 FIFA U-20 Women's World Cup (originally 2020 but postponed due to COVID-19 pandemic) in Costa Rica as the AFC representatives. However, FIFA announced on 17 November 2020 that this edition of the World Cup would be cancelled.

This edition was the last to be played as an under-19 tournament, as the AFC had agreed to the proposal for switching the tournament from under-19 to under-20 starting from 2022.

Japan are the defending champions.

Qualification

Four teams qualified directly for the final tournament: the hosts and the top three of 2017. The other four spots were determined by the qualifying stage.

A total of 27 teams entered the qualifying stage. Due to the increased number of teams, two qualification rounds were scheduled for the first time. The first round was scheduled for 20–28 October 2018, and the second round was scheduled for 22–30 April 2019.

Qualified teams
The following teams qualified for the tournament.

Venues
The matches were played at two venues, both at the Mueang Chonburi District in Chonburi Province.
Chonburi Stadium
IPE Chonburi Stadium

Draw
The draw was held on 23 May 2019, 16:30 ICT (UTC+7), at the Oakwood Hotel in Chonburi, Thailand. The eight teams were drawn into two groups of four teams. The teams were seeded according to their performance in the 2017 AFC U-19 Women's Championship final tournament and qualification, with the hosts Thailand automatically seeded and assigned to Position A1 in the draw.

Squads

Players born between 1 January 2000 and 31 December 2004 were eligible to compete in the tournament. Each team had to register a squad of minimum 18 players and maximum 23 players, minimum three of whom must be goalkeepers (Regulations Articles 24.1 and 24.2).

Group stage
The top two teams of each group advanced to the semi-finals.

Tiebreakers
Teams were ranked according to points (3 points for a win, 1 point for a draw, 0 points for a loss), and if tied on points, the following tiebreaking criteria are applied, in the order given, to determine the rankings (Regulations Article 9.3):
Points in head-to-head matches among tied teams;
Goal difference in head-to-head matches among tied teams;
Goals scored in head-to-head matches among tied teams;
If more than two teams are tied, and after applying all head-to-head criteria above, a subset of teams are still tied, all head-to-head criteria above are reapplied exclusively to this subset of teams;
Goal difference in all group matches;
Goals scored in all group matches;
Penalty shoot-out if only two teams are tied and they met in the last round of the group;
Disciplinary points (yellow card = 1 point, red card as a result of two yellow cards = 3 points, direct red card = 3 points, yellow card followed by direct red card = 4 points);
Drawing of lots.

All times are local, ICT (UTC+7).

Group A

Group B

Knockout stage
In the knockout stage, extra time and penalty shoot-out were used to decide the winner if necessary, except for the third place match where there was no extra time and penalty shoot-out was used to decide the winner if necessary (Regulations Articles 12.1, 12.2 and 12.3).

Bracket

Semi-finals
Winners qualified for 2021 FIFA U-20 Women's World Cup.

Third place match
Winner qualified for 2021 FIFA U-20 Women's World Cup.

Final

Winners

Awards
The following awards were given at the conclusion of the tournament:

Qualified teams for FIFA U-20 Women's World Cup
The following three teams from AFC would have qualified for the 2021 FIFA U-20 Women's World Cup before the tournament was cancelled.

All three teams qualified for the 2022 FIFA U-20 Women's World Cup. On 16 March 2022, the AFC announced that Australia would replace North Korea as the AFC’s representatives at the FIFA U-20 Women's World Cup.

1 Bold indicates champions for that year. Italic indicates hosts for that year.

Goalscorers

References

External links
, the-AFC.com
AFC U-19 Women's Championship 2019, stats.the-AFC.com

 
2019
U-19 Women's Championship
2019 in women's association football
2019 in youth association football
2019 in Thai football
2020 FIFA U-20 Women's World Cup qualification
2019 AFC U-19 Women's Championship
October 2019 sports events in Asia
November 2019 sports events in Asia